Flax longus is a moth of the family Erebidae first described by Michael Fibiger in 2011. It is found on Luzon in the Philippines.

The wingspan is 9-10.5 mm. The ground colour of the forewings (including fringes) is light brown, although the base of the costa is dark brown. There is a dark brown quadrangular patch in the upper medial area, with a black dot in the inner lower area. The crosslines are indistinct and brown. The terminal line is only indicated by black interveinal dots. The hindwings are light grey. The underside of the forewings is unicolorous light brown and the underside of the hindwings is grey with a discal spot.

References

Micronoctuini
Moths described in 2011
Taxa named by Michael Fibiger